Suzanne O'Sullivan is an Irish neurologist and author.

Career 
O'Sullivan is from Dublin, and studied medicine at Trinity College Dublin. She is a consultant neurologist at the National Hospital for Neurology and Neurosurgery in London. O'Sullivan completed an MA in creative writing at Birkbeck College, University of London, in 2015, for which she received a distinction.

Epilepsy and improving medical care for people with psychosomatic disorders are the main focuses of her work.

Bibliography 
Suzanne O'Sullivan has authored three non-fiction books, mostly concerned with psychosomatic illness, epilepsy, and over-medicalisation.

First book 
It's All in Your Head: True Stories of Imaginary Illness, published by Chatto & Windus in 2015, is O'Sullivan's first book. It was published to rave reviews. It was awarded the 2016 Wellcome Book Prize, the 2016 Royal Society of Biology general book prize  and was shortlisted for the Books are my Bag Readers award 2016

Content 
It’s All in Your Head discusses issues surrounding psychosomatic illness, with particular attention given to neurological manifestations of psychosomatic illness. It explores the mind-body connection through stories of O’Sullivan’s patients, and looks compassionately at the serious medical problems that can arise through pure psychological mechanisms.

In the book, O'Sullivan considers the history of the hysteria from ancient to modern times and goes on to discuss diagnosis, causes, mechanisms and treatment of neurological psychosomatic disorders in the modern era.

Characters 
Pauline, a 27-year-old woman, has had seizures, paralysis and multiple unexplained and progressive medical problems since her mid-teens.

Matthew is convinced he has MS and struggles to accept alternate explanations for his leg paralysis.

Camilla, a lawyer, cannot face the horror of what has caused her seizures

Second book 
Brainstorm: The Detective Stories from the World of Neurology is O'Sullivan's second book, published in 2018 by Chatto & Windus.

Characters 
Donal hallucinates cartoon dwarves.

Maya must make a decision about having radical surgery to cure her epilepsy.

Sharon’s seizures are not what they seem.

Brainstorm is an account of how the study of epilepsy changed scientists’ understanding of the brain. It explores modern views and treatments for epilepsy and looks at what they teach us about how the brain works.

Third book 
The Sleeping Beauties: And Other Stories of Mystery Illness is her third book, published in April 2021 by Picador (and by Pantheon in the USA)  It was shortlisted for the Royal Society Science Book Prize 2021

Content 
In this book O’Sullivan travels the world visiting communities said to be affected mass hysteria and culture bound syndromes (ways that specific cultures express distress, troubling thoughts and ask for help) It features schoolgirls in Colombia caught up in an outbreak of contagious seizures, Kazakhstani townspeople fallen foul of contagious sleeping sickness, sonic weapon attacks, attacks of ‘crazy sickness’ affecting indigenous people of Nicaragua, a Tourette’s like syndrome spreading through a New York high school

Personal life 
O’Sullivan lives in London. She qualified in medicine from Trinity College, Dublin. She completed an MA in creative writing at Birkbeck College, University of London, in 2015. She is an accredited specialist in neurology and clinical neurophysiology.

She has made many radio appearances including being interviewed on BBC Radio 4 in November, 2018, in the series The Life Scientific. She appears regularly at literary events such as the Hay Literary Festival.

Achievements 
Winner of the Wellcome Book Prize 2016 for It's All in Your Head: True Stories of Imaginary Illness.

Winner of the Royal Society of Biology General Book Prize for It's All in Your Head: True Stories of Imaginary Illness.

Shortlisted for the Books Are My Bag readers award 2016 for It’s All in Your Head 

Winner of the AITO Travel Writer of the Year in 2018 for her piece entitled ‘Going off the grid on Indonesia’s forgotten islands’ published in the Telegraph magazine

Shortlisted for the Royal Society Insight Investment Science Book Prize in 2021 for The Sleeping Beauties: And Other Stories of Mystery Illness.

Nominated for Next Big Idea Club’s top books of 2021 for The Sleeping Beauties and other stories of mystery illness

References 

Living people
Irish non-fiction writers
Irish women non-fiction writers
Year of birth missing (living people)
Alumni of Birkbeck, University of London
Irish neurologists
Women neurologists
Wellcome Book Prize